Roy O'Brien (born 27 November 1974) is an Irish footballer.

He started his career at Arsenal, before moving on to Wigan Athletic, although he made no first team appearances for either side. Having then made one appearance for AFC Bournemouth, he joined Dorchester and became a regular in their defence. In 2000, he signed for Yeovil Town where he went on to play for five years, mainly at right-back, winning two promotions from the Conference National to League One.

He joined Weymouth halfway through the 2004-05 season, after impressing while on loan from Yeovil, where he stayed until the end of season 2006-07, spending the last 5 months of his tenure at the Wessex Stadium as player-coach.

In June 2007 O'Brien rejoined Dorchester  and following Shaun Brooks' resignation, he was appointed player-manager on 5 March 2009.

On 22 November 2009, after just eight months in charge of Dorchester Town, Roy was relieved from his duties as a manager, due to the clubs poor showing in cup competitions. On 28 June 2010, he was appointed manager of Yeovil Town Ladies and will manage them in their first ever season in the FA Women's Premier League, before becoming the club's first team coach and subsequently working with the Yeovil Town Community Sports Trust.

Managerial Stats
As of 22 November 2009

Honours
Yeovil Town
FA Trophy: 2001–02

References

External links

Roy O'Brien's profile from the Weymouth website

1974 births
Living people
Republic of Ireland association footballers
Republic of Ireland football managers
Association football defenders
Arsenal F.C. players
Wigan Athletic F.C. players
AFC Bournemouth players
Yeovil Town F.C. players
Weymouth F.C. players
Dorchester Town F.C. players
Sportspeople from Cork (city)
English Football League players
Republic of Ireland expatriate football managers
Irish expatriate sportspeople in England
Dorchester Town F.C. managers